Cesare (or Caesar) Mazzolari (9 February 1937 – 16 July 2011) was the Roman Catholic Bishop of the Roman Catholic Diocese of Rumbek, in the newly independent Republic of South Sudan.

Biography 
Bishop Mazzolari was born Feb. 9, 1937 in Brescia, Italy. He joined the Comboni Missionaries of the Heart of Jesus, and on 17 March 1962 was ordained a priest in San Diego, USA. His mission brought him to Cincinnati, in the United States, where he worked among African American and Mexican American miners.

He rebuilt the Diocese of Rumbek, after the two Southern Sudanese Secession Wars (1955–1973 and 1983–2005) had devastated the country and the Government of Khartoum had expelled all foreign missionaries from the country in the 1960s.

He died a week later, on 16 July 2011, at the age of 74, while concelebrating a Mass.

Notes

External links 

 Father Mazzolari on Catholic Hierarchy  

1937 births
2011 deaths
Comboni Missionaries
Italian Roman Catholic bishops in Africa
20th-century Roman Catholic bishops in South Sudan
People from Brescia
21st-century Roman Catholic bishops in South Sudan
Italian expatriate bishops
Roman Catholic bishops of Rumbek